Cham Zel-e Shahali (also Romanized as Cham Z̧el-e Shāh‘alī; also known as Nazarabad (Persian: نظرآباد), also Romanized as Naz̄arābād) is a village in Mirbag-e Jonubi Rural District, in the Central District of Delfan County, Lorestan Province, Iran. At the 2006 census, its population was 28, in 7 families.

References 

Towns and villages in Delfan County